Consuelo Díez Fernández (born 16 August 1958) is a Spanish electroacoustic composer.

Life
Consuelo Díez was born in Madrid, Spain, and studied at the Royal Conservatory of Music in Madrid with Anton Garcia Abril and Roman Alis. She also studied art history at the Universidad Complutense de Madrid, and graduated with a Master of Arts from Hartt School of Music (USA) and a Doctorate in Musical Arts from Hartford University (USA).

After completing her studies, Diez returned to work as a composer in Madrid.  She taught music at the Conservatory in Madrid and served for five years as the director of the Center for Diffusion of Contemporary Music. Diez is married and has two children.

Works
Selected works include:
El precio
Sad for piano
Sein und Zeit for piano
Se ha parado el aire for piano
Endurance for piano
Pasión Cautiva for orchestra
La Geometría del Agua for orchestra
Iliverir for orchestra
Life for orchestra
Cartas a la oscuridad Andantino - Allegro - Allegretto - Presto
Dos Canciones
Jungle city
Ecos
Verde y Negro for flute and piano'sax and piano
Se ha parado el aire for piano
Preludio en el Jardín
Rumores del Puerto for piano
Cuatro Instantes theme with variations
Niña valiente for soprano, flute, cello and piano
Infierno Azul
EL azul está prohibido
Libertad Real
Magma for piano and electroacoustic
Trío Gala de Madrid chamber trio for flute, cello and piano

References

External links
Consuelo Diez Interview NAMM Oral History Library (2020)

1958 births
Living people
20th-century classical composers
Spanish music educators
Spanish women classical composers
Spanish classical composers
Complutense University of Madrid alumni
University of Hartford Hartt School alumni
20th-century Spanish musicians
Women music educators
20th-century women composers